Saint Mary Peak is a  mountain summit located in Ravalli County, Montana.

Description

Saint Mary Peak is located in the Bitterroot Range, which is a subset of the Rocky Mountains. It is situated eight miles west of Stevensville in the Selway–Bitterroot Wilderness, on land managed by Bitterroot National Forest. The summit lies five miles east of the Idaho–Montana border. Precipitation runoff from the mountain drains into tributaries of the Bitterroot River. A popular 3.5-mile hiking trail leads to a fire lookout tower at the summit. The lookout was originally built in 1931 and reconstructed in 1953, and was placed on the National Register of Historic Places in 2018. This landform's toponym has been officially adopted by the United States Board on Geographic Names.

Climate

Based on the Köppen climate classification, Saint Mary Peak is located in a subarctic climate zone characterized by long, usually very cold winters, and mild summers. Winter temperatures can drop below −10 °F with wind chill factors below −30 °F.

Gallery

See also
 Geology of the Rocky Mountains
 National Register of Historic Places listings in Ravalli County, Montana

References

External links
 Weather forecast: Saint Mary Peak
 Saint Mary Peak Trail: Hikingproject.com

Bitterroot Range
Mountains of Montana
Mountains of Ravalli County, Montana
North American 2000 m summits
Bitterroot National Forest